Jeff Hull may refer to:
 Jeff Hull (footballer)
 Jeff Hull (artist)